Agent-based social simulation (or ABSS) consists of social simulations that are based on agent-based modeling, and implemented using artificial agent technologies.
Agent-based social simulation is a scientific discipline concerned with simulation of social phenomena, using computer-based multiagent models. In these simulations, persons or group of persons are represented by agents. MABSS is a combination of social science, multiagent simulation and computer simulation.

ABSS models the different elements of the social systems using artificial agents, (varying on scale) and placing them in a computer simulated society to observe the behaviors of the agents.  From this data it is possible to learn about the reactions of the artificial agents and translate them into the results of non-artificial agents and simulations.  Three main fields in ABSS are agent-based computing, social science, and computer simulation.

Agent-based computing is the design of the model and agents, while the computer simulation is the part of the simulation of the agents in the model and the outcomes.  The social science is a mixture of sciences and social part of the model.  It is where social phenomena are developed and theorized. The main purpose of ABSS is to provide models and tools for agent-based simulation of social phenomena.  With ABSS, one can explore different outcomes of phenomena where it may not be possible to view the outcome in real life.  It can provide us valuable information on society and the outcomes of social events or phenomena.

Multi-agent system 
A multi-agent system is a system created from multiple autonomous elements interacting and reacting on each other. These are called Agents. See Agent-based model. In simulation, Agents can be used to simulate many different elements. These could be society, organism, machine, person or any other active element, which does, or does not exist in real world. In a multi-agent system, an agent is represented by a software program or algorithm. This program contains in itself all rules of agents behavior. The purpose of models could be simulation of social phenomena like transportation, market failures, cooperation and escalation and spreading of conflicts.
Agents in concept of ABSS
In Agent based social systems, agents 
Emergence in context of social simulation
In agent based simulations we can observe phenomenon, when model based on simple rules results in very complex dynamics. This phenomenon is related to emergence and one of recent topic of social science is concept of emerging behavior in social science (Kontopoulos, 1993; Archer, 1995; Sawyer, 2001).

History

Sugarscape  

The first widely known multi-agent generative social model was developed in 1996 by Joshua M. Epstein and Robert Axtell. The purpose of this model was simulation and research of social phenomena like seasonal migration, environmental pollution, procreation, combat, disease spreading and cultural features. Their model is based on the work of economist Thomas Schelling, presented in paper "Models of Segregation" Thomas Schelling. This model represented the first generation of computer-based social simulations. Epstein and Axtell’s model was implemented using concepts from the "Game of Life" developed by John Horton Conway.

Usage for social sciences 
There are three main objects of scientific implementation of ABSS (Gilbert, Trotzsch; 2005)

Understanding basic aspects of social phenomena 
Like aspects involving its diffusion, dynamics or results. Such a basic models should be based on simple rules, so way in which resulting behavior emerges from system could be easily observable.

Prediction 
These models are implemented to predict real life events and phenomena. Examples of use could be transportation (prediction of traffic in future to find places where traffic jams could occur), prediction of future unemployment rates etc. Problem of models made to accurately predict such an events is increasing complexity of model with number of dynamically changing  parameters.

Research, testing and formulation of hypothesis 
Unlike other two main objects,  which have use outside Social sciences, latter one is used mainly on the field of social science. Agent-based  social simulations are often used during research of new hypothesis. Simulation could be useful when there is no other way to observe agents during their actions. For example, during creation of new language, which is long-term process. Another benefit of simulation lies in fact, that to be able to prove theory in simulation, it has to be represented in formal and logical form. This leads to more coherent formulation of theory.

Multi-Agent Simulation Suites (MASS) usage for problem solving

Society and culture

Models of information diffusion in social environment 
An academic article investigates an agent-based simulation of information diffusion in Facebook online social network.

Organizing networks

Emergence of social phenomena 
Altruism and cooperation 
Ethnocentrism

Crowd behaviour 
Models for natural disasters (evacuation – fire)

Economical science

Business 
Market behavior models

Religion

Software used for implementing ABSS 

Different agent based software have been used for implementing ABSS  such as
 #k@ (HASHKAT) Online social network (e.g. Twitter, Instagram, LinkedIn) simulator, describes realtime dynamics, message passing, and user behavior. Available on Windows, OS X, and Linux  (Free Software)
 Repast
 Multi Agent Simulation Suite (MASS). Fables is a component of MASS, generating Repast J models
 Swarm (simulation) 
 Janus: Multiagent, Organizational and Holonic Platform. (Open Source Software)
 Ascape  (an implementation of the agent based model Sugarscape) 
 Ingenias  
 SeSAm Multiagent simulator and graphical modelling environment. (Free Software)
 NetLogo (Open Source Software)
 GlobalSimulate Multiparadigm simulation and modelling environment. (Open Source Software)
 GAMA GAMA is an agent-based, spatially explicit, modeling and simulation platform. (Open Source Software)
 MASON Multi-Agent Simulator Of Neighborhoods. (Open Source Software)

See also 
 Artificial life
 Simulated reality
 Social simulation
 Journal of Artificial Societies and Social Simulation

References

Further studies 
 
 
 
 
 

EPSTEIN, Joshua M. ; AXTELL, Robert. Growing Artificial Societies: social science from the bottom up. MIT Press. 1996, . 
EPSTEIN, Joshua M. Generative Social Science: studies in agent-based computational modeling. Princeton University Press. 2006
GILBERT, N. and Troitzsch, K. G. (1999). Simulation for the Social Scientist, Open University Press.

External links 
JASSS - The Journal of Artificial Societies and Social Simulation
ESSA - The European Social Simulation Association
The Society for the Study of Artificial Intelligence and the Simulation of Behaviour
Dynamics Lab University College Dublin Ireland

Agent-based model